Raoul Marie Joseph Count de Boigne (25 December 1862 – 19 May 1949) was a French sport shooter who competed at the 1906 Intercalated Games, the 1908 Summer Olympics and 1912 Summer Olympics. He was born in Geneva, Switzerland and died in Ouveillan, France.

1906 Athens

At the Intercalated Games 1906 in Athens he won a silver medal and two bronze medals.

In the 1906 Intercalated Games he also participated in the following events:

 free rifle, free position – seventh place
 50 m pistol – ninth place
 trap, single shot – tenth place
 trap, double shot – tenth place
 200 m army rifle – eleventh place
 20 m duelling pistol – eleventh place
 25 m army pistol (standard model) – twelfth place
 30 m duelling pistol – 18th place
 25 m rapid fire pistol – 23rd place

1908 London

In the 1908 Olympics he won a bronze medal in the team free rifle event, was fourth in the team military rifle event and was 19th in the individual 1000 yard free rifle event.

1912 Stockholm

Four years later he was fourth in the team free rifle event, fifth in the team military rifle event, 50th in the individual 600 m free rifle event, 53rd in the individual 300 m free rifle, three positions event and 58th in the individual 300 m military rifle, three positions event.

References

External links
 

1862 births
1949 deaths
French male sport shooters
ISSF rifle shooters
ISSF pistol shooters
Olympic shooters of France
Shooters at the 1906 Intercalated Games
Shooters at the 1908 Summer Olympics
Shooters at the 1912 Summer Olympics
Olympic bronze medalists for France
Trap and double trap shooters
Olympic medalists in shooting
Medalists at the 1906 Intercalated Games
Medalists at the 1908 Summer Olympics
Sportspeople from Geneva